Sam Horsfield (born 8 October 1996) is an English professional golfer who plays on the European Tour.

Amateur career
Horsfield has lived in the United States since he was five years old. He was selected for the 2015 Walker Cup at Royal Lytham & St Annes Golf Club but withdrew two weeks before the event. It was later reported that he thought he may not have had the correct visa and was worried he would not be allowed to return to the United States after the event. He was runner-up at the 2016 Western Amateur. Horsfield turned professional in May 2017.

Professional career
Horsfield was the medalist at the 2017 European Tour Qualifying School to earn a place on the European Tour for 2018. He had a useful start to 2018, with a 4th place in the ISPS Handa World Super 6 Perth and finishing second at the Tshwane Open, two strokes behind George Coetzee. Later in the season he was tied for 5th place in the Sky Sports British Masters and finished 52nd in the Order of Merit.

In early August 2020, Horsfield had his breakthrough win on the European Tour when he won the Hero Open by one shot over Thomas Detry. Two weeks later, Horsfield won his second European Tour event at the Celtic Classic in Wales, two strokes ahead of Detry, who finished as runner-up again.

In May 2022, Horsfield picked up his third European Tour victory at the Soudal Open in Belgium.

Horsfield was part of the inaugural LIV Golf event at Centurion Club at London, where he placed 5th, winning $975,000.

Professional wins (3)

European Tour wins (3)

Results in major championships
Results not in chronological order in 2020.

CUT = missed the halfway cut
NT = No tournament due to COVID-19 pandemic

Team appearances
Amateur
Palmer Cup (representing Europe): 2016 (winners)

See also
2017 European Tour Qualifying School graduates

References

External links
 
 
 

English male golfers
European Tour golfers
LIV Golf players
Sportspeople from Manchester
1996 births
Living people